Malananta (fl. late 4th century) was an Indian Buddhist monk and  missionary who brought Buddhism to the southern Korean peninsula in the 4th century. Multiple romanizations of Malananta's name may be found, including Meghananda (मेघानंदा), Malananda, Maranant'a and Maalaananda. He was among the first to bring Buddhist teaching, or Dharma, to Korea. The Samguk yusa and Samguk yusa record him as the one who brought Buddhism to King Chimnyu of Baekje in 384 CE, along with Sundo in Goguryeo and Ado in Silla. Buddhism,  a religion originating in what is now India, was transmitted to Korea via China in the late 4th century.

Name
Multiple romanizations of Mālānanda's name may be found, including Marananta, Maranant'a and Maalaananda. An alternative reconstruction of his name is Kumāranandin.

History
He was among the first to bring Buddhism to the Korean Peninsula. The Samgungnyusa records him as the one who brought Buddhism to Baekje, along with Sundo in Goguryeo and Ado in Silla.

Mālānanda came to Baekje from Jin China in the ninth lunar month of 384, the coronation year of Chimnyu of Baekje.  Two months before Mālānanda's arrival, King Chimnyu had sent a tribute mission to the Jin Empire, as was common upon the ascension of Baekje kings in this period. It is possible he was part of an official emissary from Jin China.

There are only scant mentions of Marananta in historical records.

See also

 Buddhism in Korea
 Buddhism in East Asia
 Buddhism and Eastern religions
 Gyeomik, went to India to study the Vinaya, then founded the Vinaya School in Korea.
 Hyecho, Korean monk from Silla who traveled to India.
 Dhyānabhadra, Indian monk and translator who went to teach in Korea during Goryeo dynasty. 
 Memorial of Heo Hwang-ok, Ayodhya
 Silk Road transmission of Buddhism
 Wang ocheonchukguk jeon

References

Notes

References

External links
 —A detailed article on the history of Korean Buddhism, including multiple images of Korean Buddhist art and a substantial bibliography.

Buddhism in Korea
Buddhism in Baekje
Indian Buddhist monks
Buddhist missionaries
Indian Buddhist missionaries
4th-century Indian monks